Pioneer Courthouse/Southwest 6th and Pioneer Place/Southwest 5th stations are a pair of light rail stations on the MAX Green, Orange and Yellow Lines in Portland, Oregon. They are the 4th stop southbound on the Portland Transit Mall MAX extension. The Pioneer Courthouse/Southwest 6th station is served only by the Green and Yellow Lines, and the Pioneer Place/Southwest 5th station is served only by the Green and Orange Lines.  Originally, from the opening of these stations in 2009 until 2015, the Yellow Line served both, but in September 2015 the then-new Orange Line replaced the Yellow Line at all southbound stations on the transit mall.

The stations are built into the sidewalks of 5th and 6th Avenues, with the 5th Avenue platform heading southbound and the 6th Avenue platform northbound. The station connects with Blue and Red Line trains on the original downtown MAX tracks at the Pioneer Square South, Pioneer Square North, Mall/SW 4th Avenue, and Mall/SW 5th Avenue stations. Nearby points of interest include Pioneer Courthouse Square, Pioneer Place and the Pioneer Courthouse.

When opened on August 30, 2009, the stations were located in Fareless Square (within fare zone 1), which was renamed the Free Rail Zone four months later, but the fare-free zone was eliminated in 2012 when TriMet discontinued all use of fare zones.

External links
Pioneer Courthouse Square/SW 5th Ave. station information from TriMet
Pioneer Place/SW 6th Ave. station information from TriMet
MAX Light Rail Stations – more general TriMet page

MAX Light Rail double stations
MAX Green Line
MAX Yellow Line
Railway stations in the United States opened in 2009
2009 establishments in Oregon
Railway stations in Portland, Oregon